Corona del Mar State Beach (Spanish for the Crown of the Sea) is a protected beach in the state park system of California, United States.  It is located in Corona del Mar, Newport Beach, and operated by the city of Newport Beach.  The  park was established in 1947.

History
The beach had been a surfing hotspot until the late 1930s, when the Newport Harbor jetty was extended, leading to the creation of The Wedge as a popular surf break, but shielding Corona from all but the most southerly swells.

Surfing legend Duke Kahanamoku is credited with the first use of a surfboard for rescue purposes at Corona del Mar beach in 1925, when a charted fishing vessel capsized in heavy surf and Kahanamoku rescued people via surfboard.

See also
List of beaches in California
List of California state parks
List of California State Beaches

References

External links
Corona del Mar State Beach

Beaches of Southern California
California State Beaches
Newport Beach, California
Parks in Orange County, California
Protected areas established in 1947
Surfing locations in California
1947 establishments in California
Beaches of Orange County, California